Horace Fisher (1861–1928), was a British painter.

Fisher's notable works include "Young Girls Picking Flowers," "A Peasant Girl on a Sunlit Veranda," "Lost in Thought" and "The Orange Sellers."

References

 "Young Girls Picking Flowers" https://www.amazon.co.uk/Picking/dp/B00DAQBXI4
 "A Peasant Girl on a Sunlit Veranda" https://www.amazon.co.uk/Peasant/dp/B00DAQ9AMU
 "Lost in Thought" http://www.christies.com/LotFinder/lot_details.aspx?intObjectID=5483965
 "The Orange Sellers" http://www.christies.com/LotFinder/lot_details.aspx?intObjectID=5874426

External links 

1861 births
1928 deaths
19th-century British painters
British male painters
20th-century British painters
19th-century British male artists
20th-century British male artists